Holger Schneider (born 4 August 1963) is a German former handball player. He competed at the 1988 Summer Olympics representing East Germany and the 1992 Summer Olympics representing unified Germany.

References

External links
 

1963 births
Living people
German male handball players
Olympic handball players of East Germany
Olympic handball players of Germany
Handball players at the 1988 Summer Olympics
Handball players at the 1992 Summer Olympics
People from Güstrow
Sportspeople from Mecklenburg-Western Pomerania